Monroe Township is one of seventeen townships in Kosciusko County, Indiana. As of the 2010 census, its population was 1,147 and it contained 473 housing units.

Monroe Township was organized in 1855.

Geography

References

External links
 Indiana Township Association
 United Township Association of Indiana

Townships in Kosciusko County, Indiana
Townships in Indiana